Zittelina is a fossil genus of algae belonging to the family Dasycladaceae.

Species:

Zittelina elegans 
Zittelina hexagonalis

References

Dasycladaceae
Ulvophyceae genera